"Freaky Gurl" is a song by rapper Gucci Mane from his 2006 album Hard to Kill and his 2007 album Trap-A-Thon. The song was produced by Cyber Sapp for Big Cat Records; its catchy beat interpolates "Superfreak" by Rick James, who is credited as a songwriter. The song performed poorly in 2006. Remixed and released as a single by Atlantic Records, it entered the Hot 100 pop chart at position 94 on October 6, 2007, then rose for two months to a peak of number 62 in early December. It peaked at number 19 on the R&B/Hip-Hop chart at the end of October. The remixed song served as the lead single to Mane's first album with Atlantic: Back to the Trap House.

The song sparked a lawsuit by Atlantic Records against Marlon Rowe, CEO of Big Cat Records. Mane had been signed to Big Cat and had released Hard to Kill in 2006 with "Freaky Gurl" on it, with little success. Mane jumped to Atlantic, buying out his Big Cat contract for $300,000 plus royalties. Mane and Atlantic remixed the song with original producer Cyber Sapp, and released the new version as a single in September 2007. When the remix entered the charts, Rowe quickly put together another Mane album—Trap-A-Thon—to capitalize on Mane's new fame, using the original mix of "Freaky Gurl" and Mane's rejected songs that had not made the album cut in 2006. Mane asked his fans not to purchase Trap-A-Thon, saying it was "unfinished and does not represent who I am today as an artist." Atlantic sued Rowe for interfering with their album project Back to the Trap House, which carried the popular remix. Big Cat argued that the remix was based on a song they still owned, and that Sapp used the original multi-track recordings to produce the remix without permission. Rowe and Atlantic resolved their dispute with a "seven-figure deal" benefiting Rowe at the end of 2007.

The remix features Lil' Kim and Ludacris. Nicki Minaj also remixed the song under the name "Wanna Minaj?" for her mixtape Sucka Free. Her remix features Mane's chorus, Lil' Kim's verse and new verse by Minaj.

Charts

Weekly charts

Year-end charts

References

2006 songs
2007 singles
Gucci Mane songs
Songs written by Rick James
Songs written by Gucci Mane